Prisoners of Gravity was a Canadian public broadcasting television news magazine program that explored speculative fiction — science fiction, fantasy, horror, comic books — and its relation to various thematic and social issues. Produced by TVOntario, the show was the brainchild of former comic retail manager Mark Askwith, writer Daniel Richler, and Rick Green (of The Frantics comedy troupe), who served as host of the show. The series aired 139 episodes over 5 seasons from 1989 to 1994.

Prisoners of Gravity episodes

Season 1

Season 2

Season 3

Season 4

Season 5

References 

 http://prisonersofgravity.com/episodes
 Prisoners of Gravity Original Episode Guide

Prisoners of Gravity